Stefano Marchetti (born 22 April 1998) is an Italian football player who plays for Serie C club AlbinoLeffe.

Club career
He made his Serie C debut for FeralpiSalò on 26 November 2017 in a game against Santarcangelo.

On 5 July 2019, he joined Renate on loan.

On 4 September 2020, he signed a one-year contract with Giana Erminio.

On 16 July 2021 he moved to AlbinoLeffe.

References

External links
 

1998 births
Living people
People from Vimercate
Footballers from Lombardy
Italian footballers
Association football defenders
Atalanta B.C. players
FeralpiSalò players
Rimini F.C. 1912 players
A.C. Renate players
A.S. Giana Erminio players
U.C. AlbinoLeffe players
Serie C players
Sportspeople from the Province of Monza e Brianza